Andrew Synnott is an Irish composer. In 2017 he became the first living Irish composer to have an opera staged at Wexford Festival Opera with the premiere of Dubliners. Wexford commissioned two further operas from him; La cucina, premiered at the festival in 2019 and  What Happened To Lucrece, premiere Wexford 2020. Synnott is also active as a conductor, including conducting from the piano his own reduction of The Tales of Hoffmann for Irish National Opera in 2018. He has conducted many opera performances in Ireland and abroad and has conducted the National Symphony Orchestra of Ireland, the RTE Concert Orchestra and the National Chamber Choir of Ireland.

Works
Dubliners (2017), libretto by Arthur Riordan based on Joyce's short stories "Counterparts" and "The Boarding House"
La Cucina (2019), Wexford Opera Festival.

References

Living people
Year of birth missing (living people)
Irish male classical composers
Irish classical composers
21st-century Irish musicians
21st-century classical composers
Irish opera composers
Male opera composers
21st-century male musicians